Trial of Champions is a single-player roleplaying gamebook, written by Ian Livingstone, illustrated by Brian Williams and originally published in 1986 by Puffin Books. It was later republished by Wizard Books in 2003. 

It forms part of Steve Jackson and Ian Livingstone's Fighting Fantasy series. It is the 21st in the series in the original Puffin series and 12th in the modern Wizard series.

Rules

Story
The story is a sequel to Fighting Fantasy title Deathtrap Dungeon, with the player assuming the role of a slave. The slave is owned by Lord Carnuss, brother of Baron Sukumvit, the designer of the original infamous dungeon. 

The player must endure a series of gladiatorial trials to be chosen as Carnuss' champion and then enter a revised "Deathtrap Dungeon", competing against five other warriors for a prize of 20,000 gold pieces. The principal character reappears in a different storyline in the title Armies of Death.

Other media
The gamebook was converted into a 40-page d20 System role-playing adventure by Jamie Wallis. It was published by Myriador in 2004 and reissued in pdf format by Greywood Publishing in 2009.

References

External links
 
 
 
 

1986 fiction books
Fighting Fantasy gamebooks
Books by Ian Livingstone
Gladiatorial combat in fiction